The 1997 Insight.com Bowl was the 9th edition to the bowl game. It featured the New Mexico Lobos and the Arizona Wildcats. It was a meeting of old Western Athletic Conference and Border Conference rivals.

Scoring summary
Arizona – Eafon 15-yard run (McDonald kick), 6:30, 1st
New Mexico – Thomas 15-yard pass from Leigh (Cason kick), 12:05, 2nd
Arizona – Canidate 3-yard run (kick failed), 7:50, 2nd
Arizona – Eafon 1-yard run (McDonald kick), 2:07, 3rd
New Mexico – Leigh 4-yard run (Cason kick), 00:26, 3rd

Arizona opened the scoring with a 15 yard touchdown run by Kevin Eafon, giving UA a 7–0 lead. It would be the only score of the 1st quarter. In the second quarter, New Mexico's Graham Leigh threw a 12 yard touchdown pass to Milton Thomas tying the game at 7. Trung Canidate scored on a 3 yard touchdown run, giving the Wildcats a 13–7 halftime lead. In the third quarter, Kevin Eafon scored on a 1 yard touchdown run, making it 20–7 Arizona. Graham Leigh's 4 yard touchdown run made the final score Arizona 20, New Mexico 14.

Statistics

Source:

References

See also
 Arizona–New Mexico football rivalry

Insight.com Bowl
Guaranteed Rate Bowl
New Mexico Lobos football bowl games
Arizona Wildcats football bowl games
Insight.com Bowl
December 1997 sports events in the United States
Sports in Tucson, Arizona
Events in Tucson, Arizona